The title Lord President may refer to one of several offices:

 Lord President of the Council, the presiding officer of the Privy Council of the United Kingdom
 Lord President of the Court of Session, the Chief Justice and Lord Justice General of Scotland
 Lord President of the Supreme Court, the title of the head of the judiciary (now Chief Justice) of Malaysia until 1994
 Lord President of the Council of the North, the historical office of the English monarch's representative in the north of England
 Lord President of Munster
 Lord President of Connaught
 Lord President of Wales

In fiction
 Lord President of the High Council of Time Lords, the most senior office of the Time Lords in the Doctor Who universe